Aaron Bruce Beasley (born July 7, 1973) is a former American college and professional football player who was a cornerback in the National Football League (NFL) for nine seasons.  He played college football for West Virginia University, and received All-American recognition.  He was drafted in the third round of the 1996 NFL Draft, and played professionally for the Jacksonville Jaguars, New York Jets and Atlanta Falcons of the NFL. Most Recently, Beasley received consensus All American recognition and is currently a nominee for the class of 2020 Hall of Fame

Early years
Beasley was born in Pottstown, Pennsylvania.  He graduated from Pottstown Senior High School in 1991, and attended Valley Forge Military Academy in Wayne, Pennsylvania, for a fifth preparatory year.

College career
Beasley attended West Virginia University, where he was a three-year starter for the West Virginia Mountaineers football team at cornerback.  In the 1994 season, Beasley led the nation with ten interceptions—also a WVU single-season record, had an interception in six consecutive games during the season.  He also had a career-high three interceptions against the Virginia Tech Hokies.  He finished 1994 with 57 tackles, a then school-record eighteen deflected passes, and three tackles for a loss.  In 1995, Beasley was recognized as a consensus first-team All-American and was a Jim Thorpe Award semifinalist.  He was also a first-team All-Big East Conference selection and semifinalist for the Big East Defensive Player of the Year Award.  He finished his college career with nineteen interceptions (second most in Mountaineers history), three of which he returned for touchdowns, and 143 tackles.

Beasley was inducted into the West Virginia University Sports Hall of Fame in 2009

Professional career
His  season for the Jaguars was his most impressive statistically, when he started all sixteen regular season games and amassed six interceptions, 200 interception return yards, and two interceptions for touchdowns, one of which against the San Francisco 49ers set the team record for the longest interception return at 93 yards. In his nine-season NFL career, he played in 121 games (105 as a starter) and compiled 423 tackles, 24 interceptions, ten forced fumbles and 8.5 quarterback sacks.
Named #20 - Top Jaguars in 2019

Life after football
Beasley resides in Sewell, New Jersey, with his wife Umme and their three daughters.

He is the founder of the Athletic Business Alliance.

Beasley trains youth, high school, college and professional athletes through the many programs he has designed and customizes to fit the needs of each client based on skill set, age and ability in group settings and individually.

References

1973 births
Living people
All-American college football players
American football cornerbacks
Atlanta Falcons players
Jacksonville Jaguars players
New York Jets players
People from Pottstown, Pennsylvania
Players of American football from Pennsylvania
West Virginia Mountaineers football players
People from Pasadena, Maryland
Valley Forge Military Academy Trojans football players
Sportspeople from Montgomery County, Pennsylvania